Kesselaid Landscape Conservation Area is a nature park in Saare County, Estonia.

Its area is 175 ha.

The protected area was designated in 1938 to protect Kesselaiu Cliff and its surrounding areas. In 2004, the protected area was redesignated to the landscape conservation area.

References

Nature reserves in Estonia
Geography of Saare County